Silva e Águas Vivas is a civil parish in the municipality of Miranda do Douro, Portugal. It was formed in 2013 by the merger of the former parishes Silva and Águas Vivas. The population in 2011 was 400, in an area of 40.61 km².

References

Freguesias of Miranda do Douro